"I dag & i morgon" is a song written by Thomas G:son and Calle Kindbom. Swedish pop and country singer Kikki Danielsson sang it when it finished 10th at the Swedish Melodifestivalen 2006. The song was originally performed by Kikki Danielsson at Melodifestivalen 2006, where it made it from the semifinal in Karlstad on 25 February directly to the final inside the Stockholm Globe Arena on 18 March, where it ended up 10th. Kikki Danielsson also recorded the song for the 2006 album with the same name.

On 16 April 2006, the song entered Svensktoppen, reaching a 6th position. On 30 April the same year, the song was knocked out from the chart.

In the lyrics of I dag & i morgon (Today and tomorrow), the singer tells her lover that she wants to live with the lover today, tomorrow, and the rest of her life.

Single
The single I dag & i morgon was released on 13 March 2006, and consisted of the title track and a recording of Yesterday Once More. The single peaked at 27th position at the Swedish singles chart. Singeln mastrades av Dragan Tanasković.

Track listing
I dag & i morgon - 2:59
Yesterday Once More - 4:57

Contributing musicians

I dag & i morgon
Backing vocals - Johanna Beijbom, Thomas G:son
Guitar - Stefan Jonsson, Thomas G:son
Mixed by - Bo Reimer
Producer - Thomas G:son

Yesterday Once More
Producer - Thomas Thörnholm

Chart performance

References

External links

2006 singles
Kikki Danielsson songs
Melodifestivalen songs of 2006
Songs written by Thomas G:son
2006 songs
Songs written by Calle Kindbom
Swedish-language songs